Segovia (Ptol. ii. 6. § 56) was an ancient city of the Roman province of Hispania Baetica, on the river Silicense (probably the modern Guadajoz. (Hirt. B. A. 57.) Its current location is in the neighborhood of Sacili or the modern Pedro Abad, Córdoba, Spain.

It is a possible site of the battle in 75 BCE where Metellus  was victorious over the general of Sertorius,  Hirtuleius.  Hirtuleius  died in the fighting

References

Notes

Roman sites in Spain
Former populated places in Spain